Inquisitor nodicostatus is a species of sea snail, a marine gastropod mollusk in the family Pseudomelatomidae, the turrids.

Description
The length of the shell attains 55,8 mm, its diameter 14,9 mm

Distribution
This marine species occurs off KwaZulu-Natal, South Africa

References

 Sysoev, A.V. (1996b) Deep-sea conoidean gastropods collected by the John Murray Expedition, 1933–34. Bulletin of the Natural History Museum of London, Zoology, 62, 1–30. page(s): 22
 Kilburn, R.N., 1988. Turridae (Mollusca: Gastropoda) of southern Africa and Mozambique. Part 4. Subfamilies Drilliinae, Crassispirinae and Strictispirinae. Annals of the Natal Museum 29(1): 167-320

External links
 
 

Endemic fauna of South Africa
nodicostatus
Gastropods described in 1988